ISFnet Inc. (株式会社アイエスエフネット) is a multinational integrated IT services company based in Tokyo, Japan. The company was founded in January 2000  by Japanese entrepreneur, Yukiyoshi Watanabe (渡邉 幸義).

ISFnet Harmony Ltd.
ISFnet Harmony Ltd. is a wholly owned subsidiary of ISFnet Inc, designated as a special subsidiary under the Japanese Disability Employment Encouragement Law. Set up in 2008, ISFnet Harmony Ltd. offers employment opportunities in the IT sector to people with disabilities.

ISFnet Care Ltd.
ISFnet Care Ltd. was established to offer diverse employment opportunities to groups of people who often find themselves excluded from the mainstream labor force, such as primary caregivers, people with disabilities or mental health problems.

Hospitality In IT
ISFnet Inc. has pioneered hospitality in the IT services sector (the adoption of 5-star hotel service standards), and was the focus of a book, IT Business Strategy and Corporate Hospitality  by Japanese business guru Masamitsu Hayashida.,

Domestic Offices
Sapporo, Sendai, Utsunomiya, Numazu, Shizuoka, Nagoya, Osaka, Hiroshima, Fukuoka, Tokyo, Morioka.

References

External links 
 
 
 
 
 
 
 

Mass media companies based in Tokyo
Telecommunications companies based in Tokyo